Impractical Jokers UK is a British hidden camera-practical joke reality television series that premiered on BBC Three on 15 November 2012. It follows the four members of the comedy troupe as they coerce one another into doing public pranks while being filmed by hidden cameras.

Series overview 
{| class="wikitable plainrowheaders" style="text-align: center;"
|-
! style="padding: 0px 8px;" colspan="2" rowspan="2"| Season
! style="padding: 0px 8px;" rowspan="2"| Episodes
! colspan="2" style="padding: 0px 8px;"| Originally aired
|-
! scope="col" style="padding: 0px 8px;"| Season premiere
! scope="col" style="padding: 0px 8px;"| Season finale
|-
 |style="background-color: #98FF98;"|
 | scope="row" style="text-align:center;"| 1
 |6
 |
 |
|-
 |style="background-color: #FFE135;"|
 | scope="row" style="text-align:center;"| 2
 |6
 |
 |
|-
|-
 |style="background-color: #FFA6B9;"|
 | scope="row" style="text-align:center;"| 3
 |9
 |2 August 2016
 |17 December 2016
|-
|}

Episodes

Series 1 (2012)

Series 2 (2014)
A second series was recommissioned, and aired on BBC Three from 24 February 2014 to 2 April 2014.

Series 3 (2016)
A third series and aired on Channel 5 and Comedy Central from August 2016.

References

Impractical Jokers UK episodes